The slaty antwren (Myrmotherula schisticolor) is a small passerine bird in the antbird family. It is a resident breeder in tropical Central and South America from southern Mexico to western Ecuador and eastern Peru.

This is a common bird in the understory of wet forest and in adjacent tall second growth in foothills typically from  700 m to 1700 m altitude, although locally it may be found down to sea level or up to 2000 m.  The female lays two red-brown spotted white eggs, which are incubated by both sexes, in a deep pouch nest constructed from plant fibres. The nest is suspended from the fork of a thin twig less than 2 m up. The male and female parents both feed the chicks.
 
The slaty antwren is typically 10 cm long, and weighs 9.5 g. The adult male is mainly dark slate with a black throat and breast, black wings with white spots, and a concealed white shoulder patch. The white on the wings is less extensive than in related species. The adult female is olive-brown above and buff-brown below, paler on the throat. Young males are darker, duller and greyer than the adult female. This species has a thin  call, and the infrequent song is a soft t’week t’week t’week t’week weet weet weet weet .

The slaty antwren is normally found as pairs, and often joins a mixed-species feeding flock with woodcreepers, red-crowned ant tanagers, ovenbirds and Basileuterus warblers. It feeds on insects and spiders, taken from foliage.

References

Stiles, F. Gary & Skutch, Alexander Frank (1989): A guide to the birds of Costa Rica. Comistock, Ithaca.

Further reading

Myrmotherula
Birds described in 1865
Taxa named by George Newbold Lawrence
Birds of Central America
Birds of South America